Paraprofessional is a title given to individuals in various occupational fields, such as education, librarianship, healthcare, engineering, and law. Historically, paraprofessionals assisted the master professional of their field. In more recent times, paraprofessionals have become a professional in their own right, providing services which meet the needs of a particular recipient or community.

Definition
The Greek prefix "para-" indicates beside or side by side (as in "parallel"); hence, a paraprofessional is one who works alongside a professional, while being a professional themselves.

Paramedic
 Paramedics in Canada, the United Kingdom, Australia, New Zealand and South Africa which autonomously practice paramedicine. Paramedics historically practiced under the medical direction of physicians in these jurisdictions. With a lack of qualified physicians to practice in the field, paramedics themselves became responsible for emergency medical services in the pre-hospital setting. Paramedics, although now distinct provider, continue to rely on the research of emergency medicine which informs and contributes to their own unique practice.

Paralegal
 Paralegals in the Province of Ontario who are licensed by the Law Society of Upper Canada to provide independent legal services to clients and the court.  Paralegals, although now distinct providers, continue to rely on the research of law which informs and contributes to their own unique practice.

Paraprofessional practice
The paraprofessional is able to perform tasks requiring significant knowledge in the field, and may even function independently of direct professional supervision. It is generally understood that paraprofessionals are the next most qualified professional after the master professional in their field. For example, physicians are allowed more independence than physician assistants (also known as paraphysicians), however physician assistants are more qualified than paramedics. Lawyers are allowed more independence than paralegals, however paralegals are more qualified than other legal professionals.

Paraprofessional education
Some paraprofessional occupations require extensive education, testing and certification, especially in the areas of law and health. Others paraprofessionals require only a certain level of education or acquire education outside the professional norm, such as in librarianship. In some occupations, such as that of a paraeducator or paralibrarian, requirements for education and certification differ geographically.

See also
Paraeducator
Paralegal
Paramedic
Paraphysician
Professional

References

Occupations
Office and administrative support occupations
Professionals